Club Enrique Happ is a football club from Cochabamba, Bolivia currently playing at Cochabamba Primera A, one of the first division regional leagues.
They play their home games at the Estadio Félix Capriles. Happ has won Primera A three consecutive years. In 2010 the club participated in Copa Simon Bolivar, but they were eliminated at the second stage.

References

Happ Logra el Titulo
Happ pierde en debut
Happ en camino a la eliminacion

Football clubs in Bolivia